Yatung or Yadong, also known as Shasima,
is the principal town in the Chumbi Valley or Yadong County in the
Tibet Autonomous Region of China. It is also its administrative headquarters.

Name 
The village is known locally as Shasima (Sharsingma) to the Tibetans, believed to be a Lepcha name.
During the British Raj era, it was called Yatung, the name having been transferred from another location called "Yatung" in the valley between the Jelep La and Rinchengang. The original location later came to be called Old Yatung.

The Chinese administration of Tibet uses the name Yatung (often transliterated "Yadong" in Chinese pinyin) for the county, and the name Shasima for the town.

Geography 

Yatung is at the confluence of the Khambu Chu and Tromo Chu (or Machu) rivers, which join here to form the Amo Chu river before it flows into Bhutan.
Downstream along Amo Chu are further villages of Chumbi, Pipitang and Chema, within four miles distance.  A further village after them is Rinchengang, which is regarded as a market town for cross-border trade.

The road to Nathu La and Jelep La passes on the Sikkim border takes off from Pipitang/Chema. The Tibetans of Chumbi Valley (referred to as "Tromowa") used to use this route to reach Kalimpong in British India, which was a major trading centre.

History

Origins 
Prior to 1904, there was a small village called Yusa on the bank of the Amo Chu river.
During the Younghusband Expedition, the British troops camped on the vacant high ground above the Yusa village. Younghusband named the location "New Chumbi", treating it as an outpost of Chumbi, which was then the most prominent town in the lower Chumbi Valley. He also had a bungalow house constructed at New Chumbi.
During the three years of British administration of the Chumbi Valley (1904–1908), the British administrator lived in the house and it came to function as the administrative headquarters of the Chumbi Valley. A trade market, a hospital and a post-and-telegraph office (PTO) also came to be located here. During this period, the location was called simply "Chumbi", and treated as an extension of the Chumbi town.

After the Chumbi Valley was transferred back to Tibet in 1908, the British government in London ruled that the British official in the Chumbi Valley would thereafter function as the "British Trade Agent at Yatung", thereby imparting the name Yatung to this location.
It was called Yatung–Shasima or New Yatung to distinguish it from the original Yatung. But, over time, "Yatung" came to mean the new location.

1905–1950 
From 1905 onwards, Yatung functioned as a trade agency for traders from British India, taking over the functions of Old Yatung, which was never used by the British again. Chinese customs office was still at Old Yatung and goods coming via Jelep La were checked there.
Scholars note that the new trade agency did not bring any significant improvements to trade, which remained at roughly Rs. 30,000 level. The Chinese amban in Lhasa posted a deputy at Yatung, who is said to have been obstructive of trade relations.

In 1910, China's assistant amban at Chamdo, Zhao Erfeng, arranged an effective Chinese invasion of Tibet. The Dalai Lama escaped from Lhasa in the nick of time and made his way to Yatung, where he received British protection. Chinese officials came here to negotiate with the Dalai Lama. But he declined their entreaties and moved on to Sikkim, where he stayed until the Chinese power was exhausted in Tibet. Chinese garrisons were posted at Yatung and other key locations of Tibet, and the powers of the Tibetan officials were stripped.

Not long afterwards, China underwent the 1911 Xinhai Revolution, and the Chinese garrisons at Yatung and Gyantse became mutinous. Their commander, General Chung Ying, overthrew the amban and declared himself the successor, claiming to act on behalf of the new Republic. The amban's officials then sought refuge from the British trade agent. But the troops were out of control and the Tibetans in open rebellion. Soon, the troops, and then the General, fled Tibet, through Yatung and Sikkim. British India gave them safe passage to China.

David MacDonald, a British officer with Lepcha heritage, worked as the trade agent at Yatung from 1909 to 1924. The post was combined with that of Gyantse trade agency till 1936, after which British India appointed Norbu Dhondup. Sonam Tobden Kazi took up the post in 1942 and served till the end of British Raj in 1947.

1950–1962

Transportation 
The China National Highway 265 connects Yatung to Phari, Gyantse and Shigatse. It also extends up to the Nathu La pass on the Sikkim border. Another provincial highway S208 goes via Khambu to Gyantse and beyond.

There were reports of plans for extending the Lhasa-Shigatse Railway to Yatung.

See also 
List of towns and villages in Tibet

Notes

References

Bibliography 
 
 1924 'first edition' reprinted by Asian Educational Services

External links
 Claude Arpi, Trading with India: The Indian Trade Agencies in Tibet, claudearpi.net, 2016.

Populated places in Shigatse
Township-level divisions of Tibet
Yadong County